Wuhan is the capital of Hubei Province in the People's Republic of China. It is the largest city in Hubei and the most populous city in Central China, with a population of over eleven million, the ninth-most populous Chinese city and one of the nine National Central Cities of China.

The name "Wuhan" came from the city's historical origin from the conglomeration of Wuchang, Hankou, and Hanyang, which are collectively known as the "Three Towns of Wuhan". Wuhan lies in the eastern Jianghan Plain, at the confluence of the Yangtze river and its largest tributary, the Han River, and is known as "Nine Provinces' Thoroughfare".

Wuhan has historically served as a busy city port for commerce and trading. Other historical events taking place in Wuhan include the Wuchang Uprising of 1911, which led to the end of 2,000 years of dynastic rule. Wuhan was briefly the capital of China in 1927 under the left wing of the Kuomintang (KMT) government. The city later served as the wartime capital of China for ten months in 1937 during the WWII.
Wuhan is considered the political, economic, financial, commercial, cultural, and educational center of Central China. It is a major transportation hub, with dozens of railways, roads, and expressways passing through the city and connecting to other major cities. Because of its key role in domestic transportation, Wuhan is sometimes referred to as "the Chicago of China" by foreign sources. The "Golden Waterway" of the Yangtze River and the Han River traverse the urban area and divide Wuhan into the three districts of Wuchang, Hankou, and Hanyang. The Wuhan Yangtze River Bridge crosses the Yangtze in the city. The Three Gorges Dam, the world's largest power station in terms of installed capacity, is located nearby. Historically, Wuhan has suffered risks of flooding, prompting the government to alleviate the situation by introducing ecologically friendly absorption mechanisms.

While Wuhan has been a traditional manufacturing hub for decades, it is also one of the areas promoting modern industrial changes in China. Wuhan has three national development zones, four scientific and technological development parks, over 350 research institutes, 1,656 high tech enterprises, numerous enterprise incubators and investments from 230 Fortune Global 500 firms. It produced GDP (nominal) of US$274 billion in 2021. The Dongfeng Motor Corporation, an automobile manufacturer, is headquartered in Wuhan. The city is home to multiple notable institutes of higher education, including Wuhan University and the Huazhong University of Science and Technology. Wuhan is a major city in the world by scientific research outputs and it ranks 11th globally, 6th in the Asia-Pacific and 5th in China (after Beijing, Shanghai, Nanjing and Guangzhou). In 2017, Wuhan was designated as a Creative City by UNESCO, in the field of design. Wuhan is classified as a Beta- (global second tier) city together with seven other cities in China, including Changsha, Dalian, Jinan, Shenyang, Xiamen, Xi'an and Zhengzhou by the Globalization and World Cities Research Network. Wuhan is also one of the world's top 100 financial centers, according to the Global Financial Centres Index.

On December 31, 2019, SARS-CoV-2, a novel coronavirus, believed to have come from bats, that caused the COVID-19 pandemic, was first discovered in Wuhan and the city was the location of the first lockdown of the pandemic in January 2020.

Etymology
The name "Wuhan" comes from the two major cities on the banks of the Yangtze River that make up the Wuhan metropolis: "Wu" refers to the city of Wuchang, which lies on the southern bank of the Yangtze, while "Han" refers to the city of Hankou, which lies on the northern bank of the Yangtze. "Hankou" means "Mouth of the Han", from its position at the confluence of the Han with the Yangtze River.

In 1926, the Northern Expedition reached the Wuhan area and it was decided to merge Hankou, Wuchang and Hanyang into one city in order to make a new capital for Nationalist China. On January 1, 1927, the resulting city was proclaimed as '' (the traditional Chinese characters for 'Wuhan'), which was later simplified as '' (also 'Wuhan').

History

Antiquity era 

The Wuhan area has been settled for 3,500 years. Panlongcheng, an archaeological site primarily associated with the Erligang culture ( BC) (being sparsely populated during the earlier Erlitou period), is located in modern-day Huangpi District of Wuhan.

During the Western Zhou the State of E, which gives its name to the single character abbreviation for Hubei province, controlled the present-day Wuchang area south of the Yangtze River. After the conquest of the E state in 863 BC, the present-day Wuhan area was controlled by the State of Chu for the rest of the Western Zhou and Eastern Zhou periods. After the State of Huang was conquered by State of Chu in the summer of 648 BC, the people of Huang were moved into the area in and around present-day Wuhan. Local geographical terms including the name of Wuhan's Huangpi District were named after the State of Huang. Chu was in turn conquered by Qin in 223 BC.

Imperial China

During the Han dynasty, Hanyang became a fairly busy port. The Battle of Xiakou in AD 203 and Battle of Jiangxia five years later were fought in the region over control of Jiangxia Commandery, territories of which included much of present-day eastern Hubei. In the winter of 208/9, one of the most famous battles in Chinese history and a central event in the Romance of the Three Kingdoms—the Battle of Red Cliffs—took place near the Yangtze River, with the cliffs near Wuhan identified as one of the potential locations. Around that time, walls were built to protect Hanyang (AD 206) and Wuchang (AD 223). The latter event marks the foundation of Wuhan. In AD 223, the Yellow Crane Tower, one of the Four Great Towers of China, was constructed on the Wuchang side of the Yangtze River by order of Sun Quan, leader of the Eastern Wu. The tower become a sacred site of Taoism.

Due to tensions between the Eastern Wu and Cao Wei kingdoms, in the autumn of 228, Cao Rui, grandson of Cao Cao and the second emperor of the state of Cao Wei, ordered the general Man Chong to lead troops to Xiakou (in present-day Wuhan). In 279, Wang Jun and his army conquered strategic locations in Wu territory such as Xiling (in present-day Yichang, Hubei), Xiakou (present-day Hankou) and Wuchang (present-day Ezhou, Hubei).

During the Northern and Southern dynasties period, the Wuhan area was part of the successive Southern dynasty states Liu Song (420–479), Southern Qi (479–502), Liang, and Western Liang.

In fall 550, Hou Jing sent Ren Yue to attack both Xiao Daxin and Xiao Fan's son Xiao Si. Ren killed Xiao Si in battle, and Xiao Daxin, unable to resist, surrendered, allowing Hou to take his domain under control. Meanwhile, Xiao Guan, who had by now settled at Jiangxia (in modern Wuhan), was planning to attack Hou, but this drew Xiao Yi's ire—believing that Xiao Guan was intending to contend for the throne—and he sent Wang to attack Xiao Guan. In summer 567, Chen Xu commissioned Wu Mingche as the governor of Xiang Province and had him command a major part of the troops against Hua, along with Chunyu Liang. The opposing sides met at Zhuankou (in modern Wuhan).

The city has long been renowned as a center for the arts (especially poetry) and for intellectual studies. Cui Hao, a celebrated poet of the Tang dynasty, visited the Yellow Crane Tower in the early 8th century; his poem made it the most celebrated building in southern China.

In spring 877, Wang Xianzhi captured E Prefecture (in modern Wuhan). He then returned north, joining forces with Huang again, and they surrounded Song Wei at Song Prefecture (in modern Shangqiu, Henan). In winter 877, Huang Chao pillaged Qi and Huang (in modern Wuhan) Prefectures.

Before Kublai Khan arrived in 1259, word reached him that Möngke had died. Kublai decided to keep the death of his brother secret and continued the attack on the Wuhan area, near the Yangtze. The present-day Wuying Pagoda was constructed at the end of the Song dynasty between attacks by the Mongolian forces. Under the Mongol rulers (Yuan dynasty) (after 1301), the Wuchang prefecture, headquartered in the town, became the capital of Hubei province. Hankou, from the Ming to late Qing, was under the administration of the local government in Hanyang, although it was already one of the four major national markets of the Ming dynasty.

Hanyang's Guiyuan Temple was completed in the 15th year of Shunzhi (1658).

By the dawn of the 18th century, Hankou had become one of China's top four trading centers. In the late 19th century, railroads were extended on a north–south axis through the city, making Wuhan an important transshipment point between rail and river traffic. Also during this period foreign powers extracted mercantile concessions, with the riverfront of Hankou being divided up into foreign-controlled merchant districts. These districts contained trading firm offices, warehouses, and docking facilities. The French had a concession in Hankou. During the Taiping kingdom, the Wuhan area was controlled for many years by rebel forces and the Yellow Crane Tower, Xingfu Temple, Zhuodaoquan Temple and other buildings were repurposed or damaged. During the Second Opium War (known in the West as the Arrow War, 1856–1860), the government of the Qing dynasty was defeated by the western powers and signed the Treaties of Tianjin and the Convention of Peking, which stipulated eleven cities or regions (including Hankou) as trading ports. In December 1858, James Bruce, 8th Earl of Elgin, High Commissioner to China, led four warships up the Yangtze River in Wuhan to collect the information needed for opening the trading port in Wuhan.

In the spring of 1861, Counselor Harry Smith Parkes and Admiral Herbert were sent to Wuhan to open a trading port. On the basis of the Convention of Peking, Parkes concluded the Hankou Lend-Lease Treaty with Guan Wen, the governor-general of Hunan and Hubei. It brought an area of  along the Yangtze River (from latter-day Jianghan Road to Hezuo Road) to become a British Concession and permitted Britain to set up its consulate in the concession.

In 1889, Zhang Zhidong was transferred from Viceroy of Liangguang (Guangdong and Guangxi provinces) to Viceroy of Huguang (Hunan and Hubei provinces). He governed the province for 18 years, until 1907. During this period, he elucidated the theory of "Chinese learning as the basis, Western learning for application," known as the ti-yong ideal. He set up many heavy industries, founded Hanyang Steel Plant, Daye Iron Mine, Pingxiang Coal Mine and Hubei Arsenal and set up local textile industries, boosting the flourishing modern industry in Wuhan. Meanwhile, he initiated education reform, opened dozens of modern educational organizations successively, such as Lianghu (Hunan and Hubei) Academy of Classical Learning, Civil General Institute, Military General Institute, Foreign Languages Institute and Lianghu (Hunan and Hubei) General Normal School, and selected a great many students for study overseas, which well promoted the development of China's modern education. Furthermore, he trained a modern military and organized a modern army including a zhen and a xie (both zhen and xie are military units in the Qing dynasty) in Hubei.

Originally known as the Hubei Arsenal, the Hanyang Arsenal was founded in 1891, who diverted funds from the Nanyang Fleet in Guangdong to build the arsenal. It cost about 250,000 pounds sterling and was built in 4 years. It built magazine-fed rifles, Gruson quick fire guns, and cartridges.

Wuchang Uprising

By 1900, according to Collier's magazine, Hankou, the Yangtze River boom town, was "the St. Louis and Chicago of China." On October 10, 1911, Sun Yat-sen's followers launched the Wuchang Uprising, which led to the collapse of the Qing state and 2,000 years of dynastic rule, as well as the establishment of the Republic of China.

The Wuchang Uprising of October 1911, which overthrew the Qing dynasty, originated in Wuhan. Before the uprising, anti-Qing secret societies were active in Wuhan. In September 1911, the outbreak of the protests in Sichuan forced the Qing authorities to send part of the New Army garrisoned in Wuhan to suppress the rebellion. On September 14 the Literary Society and the Progressive Association, two local revolutionary organizations in Hubei, set up joint headquarters in Wuchang and planned for an uprising. On the morning of October 9, a bomb at the office of the political arrangement exploded prematurely and alerted local authorities. The proclamation for the uprising, beadroll and the revolutionaries’ official seal fell into the hands of Rui Cheng, the governor-general of Hunan and Hubei, who demolished the uprising headquarters the same day and set out to arrest the revolutionaries listed in the beadroll. This forced the revolutionaries to launch the uprising earlier than planned.

On the night of October 10, the revolutionaries fired shots to signal the uprising at the engineering barracks of Hubei New Army. They then led the New Army of all barracks to join the revolution. Under the guidance of Wu Zhaolin, Cai Jimin and others, this revolutionary army seized the official residence of the governor and government offices. Rui Cheng fled in panic into the Chuyu ship. Zhang Biao, the commander of the Qing army, also fled the city. On the morning of the 11th, the revolutionary army took the whole city of Wuchang, but leaders such as Jiang Yiwu and Sun Wu disappeared. Thus the leaderless revolutionary army recommended Li Yuanhong, the assistant governor of the Qing army, as the commander-in-chief. Li founded the Hubei Military Government, proclaimed the abolition of the Qing rule in Hubei, the founding of the Republic of China and published an open telegram calling for other provinces to join the revolution.

As the revolution spread to other parts of the country, the Qing government concentrated loyalist military forces to suppress the uprising in Wuhan. From October 17 to December 1, the revolutionary army and local volunteers defended the city in the Battle of Yangxia against better armed and more numerous Qing forces commanded by Yuan Shikai. Huang Xing would arrive in Wuhan in early November to take command of the revolutionary army. After fierce fighting and heavy casualties, Qing forces seized Hankou and Hanyang. But Yuan agreed to halt the advance on Wuchang and participated in peace talks, which would eventually lead to the return of Sun Yat-sen from exile, founding of the Republic of China on January 1, 1912. Through the Wuchang Uprising, Wuhan is known as the birthplace of the Xinhai Revolution, named after the Xinhai year on the Chinese calendar. The city has several museums and memorials to the revolution and the thousands of martyrs who died defending the revolution.

Republic of China

With the northern extension of the Northern Expedition, the center of the Great Revolution shifted from the Pearl River basin to the Yangtze River basin. On November 26, the Kuomintang Central Political Committee decided to move the capital from Guangzhou to Wuhan. In mid-December, most of the KMT central executive commissioners and national government commissioners arrived in Wuhan, set up the temporary joint conference of central executive commissioners and National Government commissioners, performed the top functions of central party headquarters and National Government, declared they would work in Wuhan on January 1, 1927, and decided to combine the towns of Wuchang, Hankou, and Hanyang into Wuhan City, called "Capital District". The new national government, later known as "Wuhan nationalist government", was based in the Nanyang Building in Hankou, while the central party headquarters and other organizations chose their locations in Hankou or Wuchang.

In March 1927, Mao Zedong appeared at the Third Plenum of the KMT Central Executive Committee in Wuhan, which sought to strip General Chiang of his power by appointing Wang Jingwei leader. The first phase of the Northern Expedition was interrupted by the political split in the Kuomintang following the formation of the Nanjing faction in April 1927 against the existing faction in Wuhan. Members of the Chinese Communist Party, who had survived the April 12 massacre, met at Wuhan and reelected Chen Duxiu (Ch'en Tu-hsiu) as the Party's Secretary General. The split was partially motivated by the purge of the Communists within the party, which marked the end of the First United Front, and Chiang Kai-shek briefly stepped down as the commander of the National Revolutionary Army.

In June 1927, Stalin sent a telegram to the Communists in Wuhan, calling for the mobilization of an army of workers and peasants. This alarmed Wang Jingwei, who decided to break with the Communists and come to terms with Chiang Kai-shek. The Wuhan coup was a political shift made on July 15, 1927, by Wang Jingwei towards Chiang Kai-shek, and his Shanghai-based rival in the Kuomintang. The Wuhan Nationalist Government was established in Wuhan on February 21, 1927, and ended by August 19, 1927. After the end of the Northern Expedition, Hankou was elevated to a centrally-controlled municipality.

In the 1931 China floods, one of the deadliest flood disasters in world history, Wuhan was a refuge for flood victims from outlying areas, who had been arriving since the late spring. But when the city itself was inundated in the early summer, and after a catastrophic dike failure just before 6:00 AM on July 27, an estimated 782,189 urban citizens and rural refugees were left homeless. The flood covered an area of 32 square miles and the city was flooded under many feet of water for close to three months. Large numbers gathered on flood islands throughout the city, with 30,000 sheltering on a railway embankment in central Hankou. With little food and a complete breakdown in sanitation, thousands soon began to succumb to diseases. Jin Shilong, Senior Engineer at the Hubei Flood Prevention Agency, described the flooding:There was no warning, only a sudden great wall of water. Most of Wuhan's buildings in those days were only one story high, and for many people there was no escape – they died by the tens of thousands. ... I was just coming off duty at the company's main office, a fairly new three-story building near the center of town ... When I heard the terrible noise and saw the wall of water coming, I raced to the top story of the building. ... I was in one of the tallest and strongest buildings left standing. In 1936, when natural disaster struck Central China with widespread flooding affecting Hebei, Hunan, Jiangxi, Wuhan and Chongqing caused by the Yangtze and Huai Rivers bursting their banks, Ong Seok Kim, as Chairman of the Sitiawan Fundraising and Disaster Relief Committee, raised money and materials in support of the victims.

During the Second Sino-Japanese War and following the fall of Nanking in December 1937, Wuhan had become the provisional capital of China's Kuomintang government, and became another focal point of pitched air battles beginning in early 1938 between modern monoplane bomber and fighter aircraft of the Imperial Japanese forces and the Chinese Air Force, which included support from the Soviet Volunteer Group in both planes and personnel, as U.S. support in war materials waned.As the battle raged on through 1938, Wuhan and the surrounding region had become the site of the Battle of Wuhan. After being taken by the Japanese in late 1938, Wuhan became a major Japanese logistics center for operations in southern China.

In early October 1938, Japanese troops moved east and north in the outskirts of Wuhan. As a result, numerous companies and enterprises and large numbers of people had to withdraw from Wuhan to the west of Hubei and Sichuan. The KMT navy undertook the responsibility of defending the Yangtze River on patrol and covering the withdrawal. On October 24, while overseeing the waters of the Yangtze River near the town of Jinkou (Jiangxia District in Wuhan) in Wuchang, the KMT gunboat Zhongshan came up against six Japanese aircraft. Though two were eventually shot down, the Zhongshan sank with 25 casualties. Raised from the bottom of the Yangtze River in 1997, and restored at a local shipyard, the Zhongshan has been moved to a purpose-built museum in Wuhan's suburban Jiangxia District, which opened on September 26, 2011.

As a key center on the Yangtze, Wuhan was an important base for Japanese operations in China. On December 18, 1944, Wuhan was bombed by 77 American bombers that set off a firestorm that destroyed much of the city. For the next three days, Wuhan was bombed by the Americans, destroying all of the docks and warehouses of Wuhan, as well as the Japanese air bases in the city. The air raids killed thousands of Chinese civilians which American bombers did not know. "According to casualty statistics compiled by Hankou city in 1946, more than 20,000 were killed or injured in the December bombings of 1944."

Wuhan returned to Chinese control in September 1945. Administratively, Wuchang and Hanyang were initially combined into a new City of Wuchang, but in October 1946 were separated into the City of Wuchang (including Wuchang only) and the County of Hanyang. Hankou became a centrally controlled municipality in August 1947. Militarily, the Wuhan Forward Headquarters was established in Wuhan, headed by Bai Chongxi.

During the later stages of the Chinese Civil War, Bai sought to broker peace, proposing that the Communist Party could rule northern China while the Nationalist government retained southern China. This was rejected, and on May 15, 1949, Bai and the Wuhan garrison retreated from the city. People's Liberation Army troops entered Wuhan on the afternoon of Monday, May 16, 1949.

People's Republic

The Changjiang Water Resources Commission was reestablished in February 1950 with its headquarters in Wuhan. From June to September 1954, the Yangtze River Floods were a series of catastrophic floodings that occurred mostly in Hubei Province. Due to an unusually high volume of precipitation as well as an extraordinarily long rainy season in the middle stretch of the Yangtze River late in the spring of 1954, the river started to rise above its usual level in around late June. In 1969, a large stone monument was erected in the riverside park in Hankou honoring the heroic deeds in fighting the 1954 Yangtze River floods.

Before construction of the Wuhan Yangtze River Bridge, Hunslet Engine Company built two extra heavy 0-8-0 locomotives for loading the train ferries for crossing the Yangtze River in Wuhan.

The project of building the Wuhan Yangtze River Bridge, also known as the First Yangtze River Bridge, was regarded as one of the key projects during the first five-year plan. On October 25, 1955, construction began on the bridge proper. The same day in 1957, the whole project was completed and an opening-to-traffic ceremony was held on October 15. The First Yangtze River Bridge united the Beijing–Hankou railway with the Guangdong–Hankou railway into the Beijing–Guangzhou railway, making Wuhan a 'thoroughfare to nine provinces' in name and in fact.

After Chengdu Conference, Mao went to Chongqing and Wuhan in April to inspect the countryside and factories. In Wuhan, he called all the leaders of provinces and municipalities who had not attended Chengdu Conference to report their work. Tian Jiaying, the secretary of Mao, said that Wuhan Conference was a supplement to Chengdu Conference.

In July 1967, civil strife struck the city in the Wuhan Incident ("July 20th Incident"), an armed conflict between two hostile groups who were fighting for control over the city at the height of the Cultural Revolution.

In 1957, the Wuhan Yangtze River Bridge was built with one trestle of the bridge on the site of the tower, which had been last destroyed in 1884.

During the 1989 Tiananmen Square protests, students in Wuhan blocked the Yangtze River Railway bridge and another 4,000 gathered at the railway station. About one thousand students staged a railroad 'sit-in'. Rail traffic on the Beijing-Guangzhou and Wuhan-Dalian lines was interrupted. The students also urged employees of major state-owned enterprises to go on strike. The situation was so tense that residents reportedly began a bank run and resorted to panic-buying.

In the wake of the United States bombing of the Chinese embassy in Belgrade on May 7, 1999, protests broke out throughout China, including in Wuhan.

On June 22, 2000, a Wuhan Airlines flight from Enshi to Wuhan was forced to circle for 30 minutes due to thunderstorms. The aircraft eventually crashed on the banks of Han River in Hanyang District, all on-board perished (there were varying accounts of number of crews and passengers). In addition, the crash also killed 7 people on the ground.

Chinese protesters organized boycotts of the French-owned retail chain Carrefour in major Chinese cities including Kunming, Hefei and Wuhan, accusing the French nation of pro-secessionist conspiracy and anti-Chinese racism. The BBC reported that hundreds of people demonstrated in Beijing, Wuhan, Hefei, Kunming and Qingdao. On May 19, 2011, Fang Binxing, the Principal of Beijing University of Posts and Telecommunications (also known as "Father of China's Great Fire Wall") was hit on the chest by a shoe thrown at him by a Huazhong University of Science and Technology student who calls herself "hanjunyi" (or ) while Fang was giving a lecture at Wuhan University.

The city has been subject to devastating floods, which are now supposed to be controlled by the ambitious Three Gorges Dam, a project which was completed in 2008. The 2008 Chinese winter storms damaged water supply equipment in Wuhan: up to 100,000 people were out of running water when several water pipes burst, cutting the supply to local households. The 2010 Northern Hemisphere summer heat wave hit Wuhan on July 3.
In the 2010 China floods, the Han River at Wuhan experienced its worst flooding in twenty years, as officials continued sandbagging efforts along the Han and Yangtze Rivers in the city and checked reservoirs. In the 2011 China floods, Wuhan was flooded, with parts of the city losing power. In the 2016 China floods, Wuhan saw  of rainfall during the first week of July, surpassing the record that fell on the city in 1991. The city's subway system, the Wuhan Metro was partially submerged as was the main railway station. At least 14 city residents were killed, one was missing, and more than 80,000 were relocated.

In early July 2019, there were protests against plans for a new incinerator in Xinzhou District.

The 2019 Military World Games were hosted in Wuhan in October.

In December 2019, SARS-CoV-2, a novel coronavirus that caused the COVID-19 pandemic, was first discovered in Wuhan, and the city was the location of the first lockdown of the pandemic in January 2020. Wuhan and other Hubei cities were placed under lockdown for nearly three months to contain the disease. On April 8, 2020, the Wuhan lockdown officially came to an end after no new domestic cases were reported in Hubei province.  The virus is believed to have been a mutation of a virus that existed in bats which came from a wet market in Wuhan, although no bats are sold there.  There were, however, some 38 other species of animals offered, including marmots, raccoons, badgers, hedgehogs, peacocks, and various reptiles, including some endangered species.

Geography

Overview

Wuhan is in east-central Hubei, at latitude 29° 58'–31° 22' N and longitude 113° 41'–115° 05' E. Wuhan sits at the confluence of the Han River flowing into the Yangtze River at the East of the Jianghan Plain along the Yangtze's middle reaches.

The metropolitan area comprises three parts—Wuchang, Hankou, and Hanyang—commonly called the "Three Towns of Wuhan" (hence the name "Wuhan", combining "Wu" from the first city and "Han" from the other two). The consolidation of these cities occurred in 1927 and Wuhan was thereby established. The three former cities face each other across the rivers and are linked by bridges, including one of the first modern bridges in China, known as the "First Bridge".
 Wuchang lies south east of the Yangtze River that separates it from both Hankou and Hanyang.
 Hankou sits north of the Yangtze River separating it from Wuchang. Hankou is north of the Han River separating it from Hanyang.
 Hanyang lies west of the Yangtze separating it from Wuchang. Hanyang is south of the Han river separating it from Hankou.

It is simple in terrain—low and flat in the middle and hilly in the south, with the Yangtze and Han rivers winding through the city. The She River enters the Yangtze in Huangpi District. Water makes up one quarter of Wuhan's urban territory, which is the highest percentage among major cities in China. Wuhan has nearly 200 lakes, including the East Lake of 33 km2, and Tangxun Lake, which are the largest lakes entirely within a city in China.

Other well-known lakes include South Lake and Sand Lake. Liangzi Lake, the largest lake by surface area in Hubei province, is located in the southeast of Jiangxia District. There are also several mountains within the city limits of Wuhan including Mount Luojia in Wuchang District as well as Mount Hong and Mount Yujia in Hongshan District.

Climate
Wuhan's climate is humid subtropical (Köppen Cfa) with abundant rainfall in summer and four distinctive seasons. Wuhan is known for its humid summers, when dewpoints can often reach  or more. Historically, along with Chongqing and Nanjing, Wuhan is referred to as one of the "Three Furnacelike Cities" along the Yangtze River for their hot summers. However, the climate data of recent years suggests that Wuhan is no longer among the top tier of "The hottest cities in summer" list, the New Four Furnacelike Cities are Chongqing, Fuzhou, Hangzhou, and Nanchang. Spring and autumn are generally mild, while winter is cool with quite low rainfall and occasional snow. With monthly possible sunshine percentage ranging from 31 percent in March to 59 percent in August, the city proper receives 1,865 hours of bright sunshine annually.

Government and politics

Wuhan is a sub-provincial city. Municipal government is regulated by the local Chinese Communist Party (CCP), led by the Wuhan CCP Secretary, Wang Zhonglin. The local CCP issues administrative orders, collects taxes, manages the economy, and directs a standing committee of the Municipal People's Congress in making policy decisions and overseeing the local government.

Government officials include the mayor, Zhou Xianwang, and vice-mayors. Numerous bureaus focus on law, public security, and other affairs.

Administrative divisions

The sub-provincial city of Wuhan currently comprises 13 districts. As of the Sixth Census of China in 2010, the 13 districts comprised 160 township-level divisions including 156 subdistricts, 3 towns, 1 townships.

Diplomatic missions

There are four countries that have consulates in Wuhan:

The current U.S. Consul General, the Honorable Mr. Jamie Fouss, was posted to Wuhan in August 2017. The office of the U.S. Consulate General, Central China (located in Wuhan) celebrated its official opening on November 20, 2008, and is the first new American consulate in China in over 20 years.

In 2015, Japan
and Russia announced their intentions to establish consular offices in Wuhan.

Economy

Up until the 21st century, Wuhan was largely an agricultural region. Since 2004 it has been a focal point of the Rise of Central China Plan, which aims to build less-developed inland economies into hubs of advanced manufacturing.

Since 1890, the steel industry has been the backbone of Wuhan's industry. In 2010, automobile industry exceeded GDP for Wuhan Iron and Steel Corporation (WISCO) steel for the first time. There are 5 car manufacturers, including Dongfeng Honda, Citroen, Shanghai GM, DFM Passenger Vehicle and Dongfeng Renault. Dongfeng-Citroen Automobile Co., Ltd is headquartered in the city.

As of 2016, Wuhan has attracted foreign investment from over 80 countries, with 5,973 foreign-invested enterprises established in the city with a total capital injection of $22.45 billion USD. Among these, about 50 French companies including Renault and PSA Group have operations in the city, representing over one third of French investment in China, and the highest level of French investment in any Chinese city.

Wuhan is an important center for economy, trade, finance, transportation, information technology, and education in China. Its major industries include optic-electronic, automobile manufacturing, iron and steel manufacturing, new pharmaceutical sector, biology engineering, new materials industry and environmental protection. Environmental sustainability is highlighted in Wuhan's list of emerging industries, which include energy efficiency technology and renewable energy.

As of 2021, Wuhan is ranked among the world's top 100 financial centers, according to the Global Financial Centres Index.

Industrial zones
Major industrial zones in Wuhan include in chronological order:

 Wuhan Economic and Technological Development Zone
Wuhan Economic and Technological Development Zone is a national level industrial zone incorporated in 1993. Its current zone size is about 10–25 square km and it plans to expand to 25–50 square km. Industries encouraged in Wuhan Economic and Technological Development Zone include Auto-mobile Production/Assembly, Biotechnology/Pharmaceuticals, Chemicals Production and Processing, Food/Beverage Processing, Heavy Industry, and Telecommunications Equipment.
 Wuhan Export Processing Zone
Wuhan Export Processing Zone was established in 2000. It is located in Wuhan Economic and Technology Development Zone, planned to cover  of land. The first  area has already been created.
 Wuhan Donghu New Technology Development Zone
Wuhan Donghu New Technology Development Zone is a national level high-tech development zone. Optical-electronics, telecommunications, and equipment manufacturing are the core industries of Wuhan East Lake High-Tech Development Zone (ELHTZ) while software outsourcing and electronics are also encouraged. ELHTZ is China's largest production center for optoelectronic products with key players like Yangtze Optical Fiber and Cable, (the largest fiber-optical cable maker in China), and Fiberhome Telecommunications. Wuhan Donghu New Technology Development Zone also represents the development center for China's laser industry with key players such as HG Tech and Chutian Laser being based in the zone.
 Wuhan Optical Valley (Guanggu) Software Park
Wuhan Optical Valley (Guanggu) Software Park is located in Wuhan Donghu New Technology Development Zone.
 Wuhan Biolake
Biolake is an industrial base established in 2008 in the Optics Valley of China.

Demographics

Wuhan is the most populous city in Central China and among the most populous in China. In the Seventh Census of China in 2020, Wuhan was home to 12,326,500 inhabitants, a 25.97% increase by 2.5411 million compared to the last census in 2010. 2010-2020 is the fastest growing 10 years in history since the census was established, averaging 2.34% annually, and it was the first time that Wuhan's population reached 10 million.

The encompassing metropolitan area was estimated by the OECD (Organization for Economic Cooperation and Development) to have, a population of 19 million.
As of November 2019, urban development status considering both spatial and socioeconomic processes has been examined using Night Time Lighting data and land cover data as proxies; it showed Wuhan's high concentration
of socioeconomic activities compared to its urban spatial development.

Religion

According to a survey published in 2017, 79.2% of the population of Wuhan are either irreligious or practice worship of gods and ancestors; among these 0.9% are Taoists. Among other religious doctrines, 14.7% of the population adheres to Buddhism, 2.9% to Protestantism, 0.3% to Catholicism and 1.6% to Islam, and 1.6% of the population adheres to unspecified other religions.

Transportation

Railways 
China Railway Wuhan Group manages the Wuhan Railway Hub. Wuhan Railway Hub is considered one of the four key railway hubs of China. The city of Wuhan is served by three major railway stations: the Hankou railway station in Hankou, the Wuchang railway station in Wuchang, and the Wuhan railway station, located in a newly developed area east of the East Lake (Hongshan District). As the stations are many miles apart, it is important for passengers to be aware of the particular station(s) used by a particular train.

The (original) Hankou Station was the terminus for the Jinghan railway from Beijing, while the Wuchang Station was the terminus for the Yuehan railway to Guangzhou. Since the construction of the First Yangtze Bridge and the linking of the two lines into the Jingguang railway, both Hankou and Wuchang stations have been served by trains going to all directions, which contrasts with the situation in such cities as New York or Moscow, where different stations serve different directions.

With the opening of the Hefei-Wuhan high-speed railway on April 1, 2009, Wuhan became served by high-speed trains with Hefei, Nanjing, and Shanghai; several trains a day now connect the city with Shanghai, getting there in under six hours. As of early 2010, most of these express trains leave from the Hankou railway station.

In 2006, construction began on the new Wuhan railway station with 11 platforms, located on the northeastern outskirts of the city. In December 2009, the station was opened, as China unveiled its second high-speed train with scheduled runs from Guangzhou to Wuhan. The travel time between the two cities has been reduced from ten and a half hours to just three. The rail service has been extended north to Beijing.

, the new Wuhan railway station is primarily used by the Wuhan-Guangzhou high-speed trains, while most regular trains to other destinations continue to use the Hankou and Wuchang stations.

Construction work is carried out on several lines of the new Wuhan Metropolitan Area intercity railway, which will eventually connect Wuhan's three main rail terminals with several stations throughout the city's outer areas and farther suburbs, as well as with the nearby cities of Xianning, Huangshi, Huanggang, and Xiaogan. The first line of the system, the one to Xianning, opened for passenger operations at the end of 2013. The line to Xiaogen opened on December 1, 2016, and it was extended with the opening of the Wuhan–Shiyan high-speed railway to Shiyan on November 29, 2019.

The main freight railway station and classification yard of the Wuhan metropolitan area is the extensive Wuhan North railway station, with 112 tracks and over 650 switches.

Metro

Wuhan Metro is a rapid transit system serving the city of Wuhan. Line 1, the first line in the system, opened on July 28, 2004, making Wuhan the seventh city in mainland China with a rapid transit system, after Beijing, Tianjin, Shanghai, Guangzhou, Changchun, and Dalian. Line 2 opened on December 28, 2012, and is the first underground metro line crossing the Yangtze River. Commuting across the Yangtze River and Han River has been the bottleneck of Wuhan traffic. However, the appearance of Wuhan Metro greatly relieved this problem. With 1.22 billion annual passengers in 2019, Wuhan Metro is the sixth-busiest rapid transit system in mainland China. Wuhan Metro is a rapidly developing metro system. There are a number of lines or sections under construction. The government of Wuhan City promised the citizens that at least two lines or sections open every year. Due to the COVID-19 pandemic, the entire network was out of service from January 23 to March 27, 2020.

Trams

Trams were brought to the streets of Wuhan on July 28, 2017, with the first line (Auto-city T1 Line) opened that day. The trams under construction or planning in Wuhan are:
 Auto-city trams, with Lines T1, T2, T6, and T8 in the Wuhan Economic Development Area, in the far western reaches on Hanyang. T1 Line is operational as of 2017.
 Optics Valley trams, two lines (T1 and T2) south and east of Guanggu Circle (Guanggu Guangchang) in southeastern Wuchang. The system opened on January 18, 2018.
 The Old Hankou Streetcar, a loop line around Hankou city.

Maritime transport
Wuhan is a major hub for maritime transport in central China. The Port of Wuhan provide services for the local population and shipping services.

Ferry
Located on the banks of the Yangtze River, Wuhan has a long history of ferry services. Modern ferry services were established in 1900 by steam boat. In 1937, a train ferry was established to transport train cars from Hankou to Wuchang. There are numbered stops around Wuhan where people can get on and off the ferry and there is a tourist ferry in the night.

Currently, ferry services are provided by the Wuhan Ferry Company. In 2010, the company bought ten new ships to replace those that had been in service for 29 years.

Airports 

Wuhan Tianhe International Airport is one of the busiest airports in central China. The airport opened in April 1995 to replace the old Hankou Wangjiadun Airport and Nanhu Airport as the major airport of Wuhan. The extension of Line 2 of Wuhan Metro to Tianhe Airport opened on December 28, 2016. It has also been selected as China's fourth international hub airport after Beijing Capital, Shanghai Pudong and Guangzhou Baiyun. A second terminal was completed in March 2008, having been started in February 2005 with an investment of CNY 3.372 billion. International flights to neighboring Asian countries have also been enhanced, including direct flights to Tokyo and Nagoya, Japan. Terminal 3 has been available for service since early 2017.

Wuhan Hannan General Airport is an airport dedicated to general aviation, located in Hannan District of Wuhan. It is the largest airport in China that only handles general aviation. On December 1, 2017, construction began on Wuhan Caidian General Airport, another airport dedicated to general aviation, which is located in Caidian District of Wuhan.

Highways and expressways 
Numerous major highways and expressways pass through Wuhan, including:
 China National Highway 107
 China National Highway 316
 China National Highway 318
 G42 Shanghai–Chengdu Expressway
 G0422 Wuhan–Shenzhen Expressway

Bicycle-sharing system
, the Wuhan and Hangzhou Public Bicycle bike-share systems in China were the largest in the world, with around 90,000 and 60,000 bicycles respectively. In 2012 the Wuhan and Hangzhou Public Bicycle programs in China are the largest in the world, with around 90,000 and 60,000 bicycles respectively. China has seen a rise in private "dockless" bike shares with fleets that dwarf systems in size outside China. Initially, a number of traditional (third-generation) docked public bike systems operated by local municipal governments opened across China, with the largest ones being in Wuhan and Hangzhou. The first was introduced in Beijing in 2007. However, third-generation bike sharing is not considered successful for the majority cities in China. Bike sharing in Beijing virtually stopped and it also has encountered difficulties in Shanghai and Wuhan.

Destinations

 The Yellow Crane Tower (Huanghelou) is presumed to have been first built in approximately 220 AD. The tower has been destroyed and reconstructed numerous times, and was burned last according to some sources in 1884. The tower underwent complete reconstruction in 1981. The reconstruction utilized modern materials and added an elevator while maintaining the traditional design in the tower's outward appearance.
 Wuchang has the largest and second largest lakes within a city in China, the East Lake and Tangxun Lake, as well as the South Lake. East Lake in Wuhan is six times the size of the West Lake in Hangzhou, Zhejiang province. In the springtime, the shores of East Lake become a garden of flowers with the Mei blossoms as the king and the Cherry Blossom as the queen among the species at East Lake Cherry Blossom Park. Another famous flower is the lotus. The lake has a long history and especially the Chu Kingdom is well represented around East Lake. Moreover, in the Moshan Botanic Garden there are many types of plum blossoms, as well as lotus flowers.

 The Hubei Provincial Museum: With over 200,000 valued artifacts, this is one of the leading museums in China. Especially the artefacts from the tomb of Marquis Yi of Zeng (Zeng Hou Yi), who lived in the 5th century BC, is a world unique treasure. The bell chime of Marquis Yi of Zeng is a bronze instrument performed 2430 years ago in ancient China (Warring States Period), and was discovered in the Tomb of Marquis Yi of Zeng in Suizhou, Hubei in 1978. The whole chime weighs 5 tons, can perfectly play sound which was heard 2430 years ago, and was considered "The Eighth Wonder of the World".
 The Wuhan Museum has a collection of more than 100,000 artifacts, including ceramic, bronze ware, paintings and calligraphy, jade, wood carving, enamel ware, seals and so on. As a modern comprehensive museum, Wuhan Museum has the function in cultural relic collection, academic reach, publicity and education, cultural exchange, and recreation and entertainment.

 Happy Valley Wuhan is a theme park in Hongshan District. Opened on April 29, 2012, it is the fifth installation of the Happy Valley theme park chain.
 The Rock and Bonsai Museum includes a mounted platybelodon skeleton, many unique stones, a quartz crystal the size of an automobile, and an outdoor garden with miniature trees in the penjing ("Chinese Bonsai") style.
 Jiqing Street holds many roadside restaurants and street performers during the evening and is the site of a Live Show with stories of events on this street by contemporary writer Chi Li.
 The Lute Platform in Hanyang was where the legendary musician Yu Boya is said to have played. This is the birthplace of the renowned legend of seeking a soul mate through "high mountains and flowing water". According to the story behind the Chinese word '', Yu Boya played for the last time over the grave of his friend Zhong Ziqi, then smashed his lute because the only person able to appreciate his music was dead.
 Mao's Villa, Mao Zedong's villa between 1960 and 1974; includes garden, living quarters, conference room, bomb shelter and swimming pool.
 Some luxury riverboat tours begin here after a flight from Beijing or Shanghai, with several days of flatland cruising and then climbing through the Three Gorges with passage upstream past the Gezhouba and Three Gorges dams to the city of Chongqing. With the completion of the dam, a number of cruises now start from the upstream side and continue west, with tourists traveling by motorcoach from Wuhan.
 Wuying Pagoda or the "Shadowless Pagoda" is the oldest standing architectural feature in Wuhan, dating from the closing days of the Southern Song dynasty.
 Chu River and Han Street, a shopping district located in Wuchang with many tourist attractions, including Han Show theater, Madame Tussauds wax museum, and Movie Culture Park, etc. This project was initiated as a water connecting channel between East Lake and Shahu Lake.
 Wuhan Zoo in Hanyang.
 The Huanan Seafood Wholesale Market is a live animal and seafood market in the Jianghan District. The market is located in the newer part of the city near shops and apartment blocks and is close to Hankou railway station. The market has been identified as a possible point of origin of the COVID-19 pandemic.
 The Wuhan Institute of Virology is located in the Wuchan District. It is, "the key laboratory of the Chinese Academy of Sciences for newly emerging and fulminating infectious disease pathogen and biosecurity."

Education

Schools and universities

There are 35 higher educational institutions in Wuhan, making it a leading educational hub for China. Prominent institutions include Huazhong University of Science and Technology and Wuhan University. Three state-level development zones and many enterprise incubators are also significant in Wuhan's education and business development. Wuhan ranks third in China in overall strength of science and technology.

As of the end of 2013, in Wuhan there were 1,024 kindergartens with 224,300 children, 590 primary schools with 424,000 students, 369 general high schools with 314,000 students, 105 secondary vocational and technical schools with 98,600 students, and 80 colleges and universities with 966,400 undergraduates and junior college students and 107,400 postgraduate students. There are several international schools in Wuhan.

Huazhong University of Science and Technology (HUST), located in the Optics Valley of China near East Lake, is a Project 985 and Class A Double First Class University. HUST manages Wuhan National Laboratories for Opto-electronics (WNLO), which is one of the five national laboratories in China. HUST is also one of four Chinese universities eligible to run the national laboratory and the national major science and technology infrastructure. Founded in 1953 as Huazhong Institute of Technology, it combined with three other universities (including former Tongji Medical University founded in 1907) in 2000 to form the new HUST, and has 42 schools and departments covering 12 comprehensive disciplines. HUST has 12 Fellows of Chinese Academy of Sciences and 17 Fellows of Chinese Academy of Engineering. As of 2022, the U.S. News' 2023 U.S. News & World Report ranked HUST 109th in the world, 15th in Asia and 6th in China, while the Academic Ranking of World Universities ranked the university 96th in the world, 14th in Asia and 8th in China. More than 2,000 international students from 120 countries pursue degrees at HUST.

Wuhan University is another Project 985 and Class A Double First Class University, which was ranked the 194th by the 2023 QS World University Rankings and 173rd by the 2023 Times Higher Education; established in 1893, the old Wuhan University absorbed three other schools (two of them being its spin-offs since the 1950s) in 2000 to become a university with 36 schools in 6 faculties. Since the 1950s it has received international students from more than 109 countries.

Scientific research

Wuhan contains three national development zones and four scientific and technological development parks, as well as numerous enterprise incubators, over 350 research institutes, 1470 high-tech enterprises, and over 400,000 experts and technicians.

Founded in 1958, the Wuhan Branch of Chinese Academy of Sciences is one of the twelve national branches of CAS. It is composed of 9 independent organizations, including the headquarters at Xiaohongshan, Wuchang. It has had a staff of 3,900, among which 8 are CAS fellows, and one is a Chinese Academy of Engineering fellow. As of 2013, the achievements gained by WHB had won 23 National Awards and 778 Provincial Awards. Wuhan Research Institute of Post and Telecommunications (now known as FiberHome Technologies Group) is the national center for optical communication research in China, and is where the first optical fiber in the country was produced. The Wuhan Institute of Virology is also operated by the CAS.

Wuhan University of Technology is another major national university with three main campuses located in the Wuchang District. Founded in the year 2000, it was merged from three major universities, Wuhan University of Technology (established in 1948), Wuhan Transportation University (established in 1946) and Wuhan Automotive Polytechnic University (established in 1958). Wuhan University of Technology, together with China University of Geosciences (Wuhan), Huazhong Agricultural University, Zhongnan University of Economics and Law and Central China Normal University (or Huazhong Normal University), are the leading Chinese universities accredited by the Ministry of Education under the "State Project 211" for Chinese higher education institutions. Other major research universities have its seat in the city, including Wuhan University of Science and Technology, Hubei University, Hubei University of Technology, and South Central University for Nationalities.

Media

The headquarters of Hubei Television is located in Wuchang District. Tortoise Mountain TV Tower is China's first self-developed TV tower, opened in 1986. The modern newspapers in Wuhan can be dated back to 1866, when Hankow Times, a newspaper in English, was founded. Before 1949, more than 50 newspapers and magazines were published by foreigners in Wuhan. Chao-wen Hsin-pao, founded by Ai Xiaomei in 1873, was the first Chinese newspaper to appear in Hankou (one of the cities that was merged into Wuhan). During the Northern Expedition era (1926–1928), journalism in Wuhan came to a climax; more than 120 newspapers and periodicals, including national newspapers such as Central Daily News and Republican Daily News, were founded or published during this time. Chutian Metropolis Daily and Wuhan Evening News are two major local commercial tabloid newspapers. Both of them have entered the list of 100 most widely circulated newspapers of the world.

Culture 
The plum blossom is the city's emblem, chosen partly because of the long history of local plum cultivation and use, and partly to recognize the plum's current economic significance in terms of cultivation and research. Local wild plums were used medicinally during the Qin and Han dynasties. Cultivation of the fruit began during the Song dynasty. Some traditional new year customs revolve around the planting of plums.

Language

Wuhan natives speak a variety of Southwestern Mandarin Chinese referred to as Wuhan dialect that differs slightly between the districts of Wuhan, including Wuchang dialect in Wuchang District, Hankou dialect in the Hankou districts, Hanyang dialect in Hanyang District, and Qingshan dialect in Qingshan District.

Cuisine

Hubei cuisine is one of China's ten major styles of cooking. With a history of more than 2,000 years, Hubei cuisine, originating in ancient Chu cuisine, has developed a number of distinctive dishes, such as steamed blunt-snout bream in clear soup, preserved ham with flowering Chinese cabbage, and others. On the third day of the third month of the lunar calendar, many in Wuhan eat , an egg dish which is supposed to prevent illness in the coming year.

"No need to be particular about the recipes; all foods have their own uses. Rice wine and tangyuan are excellent midnight snacks, while fat bream and flowering Chinese cabbages are great delicacies." This attitude expressed in Hankou Zhuzhici reflects indirectly the eating habits and a wide variety of distinctive snacks with a long history in Wuhan, such as Qingshuizong (a pyramid-shaped dumpling made of glutinous rice wrapped in bamboo or reed leaves) in the Period of the Warring States, Chunbinbian in Northern and Southern dynasties, mung bean jelly in the Sui dynasty, youguo (a deep-fried twisted dough stick) in the Song and Yuan dynasties, rice wine and mianwo in the Ming and Qing dynasties, as well as three-delicacy stuffed skin of bean milk, tangbao (steamed dumpling filled with minced meat and gravy) and hot braised noodles (reganmian) in modern times.

Guozao is a popular way to say 'having breakfast' in Wuhan, and a part of the city's culture. As a hub for land transport in China, Wuhan has gathered and mixed together various habits and customs from neighboring cities and provinces in all directions, which gives rise to a concentration of diverse cuisines from different places. The most famous place to guozao (have breakfast) is Hubu Street, a 150-meter-long street in the neighborhood of Simenkou. Along its short length one can find nearly all the traditional foods of Wuhan, such as:

 Hot and dry noodles, re-gan mian, consists of long freshly boiled noodles mixed with sesame paste. It is considered to be the most typical local food for breakfast.
 Duck's neck or Ya Bozi is a local version of this popular Chinese dish, made of duck necks and spices.
 Bean skin or doupi is a local dish with a filling of egg, rice, beef, mushrooms and beans cooked between two large round soybean skins and cut into pieces, structurally like a stuffed pizza without enclosing edges.
 Soup dumpling or xiaolongtangbao is a kind of dumpling with thin skin made of flour, steamed with very juicy meat inside, hence the name: tang (soup) bao (bun) – every time one takes a bite from it the "soup" inside is liable to spill out.
 A salty doughnut or mianwo is a kind of savory donut with a salty taste. It is much thinner than a common donut and is a typical Wuhan local food.
 Shaomai wrapped in oil cake (油饼包烧麦): 1 oil cake is filled with 4 pieces of heavy oil siomai, and the heavy oil is required to put diced meat, mushrooms, bamboo shoots, and black pepper in it.
 Paste Soup Noodles (糊汤粉): It is a snack variety that uses round rice noodles as the main ingredient, fish paste soup, small shrimp, and chopped green onion as accessories.

Opera
Han opera, which is the local opera of Wuhan area, was one of China's oldest and most popular operas. During the late Qing dynasty, Han opera, blended with Hui opera, gave birth to Peking opera, the most popular opera in modern China. Thus Han opera has been called the "mother of Peking opera."

Sports

Wuhan had a professional football team, Wuhan, that plays in the China League One. Xinhua Road Sport Center, the team's home stadium, with a capacity of 32,137, is located in the heart of the city next to Zhongshan Park. For the 2013 season, Wuhan Zall was promoted to the top-tier league of Chinese football, Chinese Super League, and relocated its home to Wuhan Sports Center Stadium, a modern stadium with 54,357 seats located in the suburbs of the city. However, the team did not play well in the ensuing season and was demoted back to China League One as the 2013 season ended. For financial and transportation reasons, the team moved back to Xinhua Road Sport Center in 2014.  In January 2023, the team folded. Wuhan also has the Wuhan Three Towns in the Chinese Super League, who won the title during the 2022 season for the first time upon promotion from China League One.

The Wuhan Gators are a professional arena football team based in Wuhan. They are members of the China Arena Football League (CAFL).

The 13,000-seat Wuhan Gymnasium held the 2011 FIBA Asia Championship and was one of the venues for the 2019 FIBA Basketball World Cup. The 7th Military World Games were hosted in Wuhan from Oct 18 to 27, 2019.

The city has been the venue for the women's tennis tournament, the Wuhan Open, one of the WTA's Premier 5 tournaments, since 2014.

Architecture

Bridges

Wuhan has eleven bridges and one tunnel across the Yangtze River. The Wuhan Yangtze River Bridge, also called the First Bridge, was built over the Yangtze in 1957, carrying a railroad directly across the river between hills known as Snake Hill and Turtle Hill. Before this bridge was built it could take up to an entire day to barge railcars across. It was built with the assistance of advisers from the Soviet Union.

With six lanes on the deck, the bridge is designed to handle the daily passage of 50,000 motor vehicles. The bridge was completed in 1995.

The Third Wuhan Yangtze River Bridge, also called Baishazhou Bridge, was completed in September 2000. The bridge is expected to serve as a major passage for the future Wuhan Ring Road, greatly easing the city's traffic and aiding local economic development.

The Yangluo Bridge carries Wuhan's Ring Road across the Yangtze in the city's eastern suburbs (connecting the Hongshan District with the Xinzhou District). It was opened on December 26, 2007.

The Wuhan Tianxingzhou Yangtze River Bridge crosses the Yangtze in the northeastern part of the city, downstream of the Second bridge. It is named after Tianxing Island (Tianxingzhou), above which it crosses the river. Built at a cost of 11 billion yuan, the 4,657-meter cable suspension bridge was opened on December 26, 2009, in time for the opening of the Wuhan railway station. It is a combined road and rail bridge, and carries the Wuhan–Guangzhou high-speed railway across the river.

Skyscrapers

The Yellow Crane Tower, historically one of the tallest buildings in Wuhan, is considered one of the Four Great Towers of China and was destroyed twelve times, both by warfare and by fire. The tower is classified as an AAAAA scenic area by the China National Tourism Administration. At  in height, the Wuhan Center skyscraper, the tallest structure in Wuhan and in Central China, is the eighth tallest structure in China. The Minsheng Bank Building, the second tallest structure in Wuhan, was the tallest building in Wuhan when it was completed in 2007. It retained the title until Wuhan Center surpassed it in 2014. Wuhan World Trade Tower is a 273-meter (896 foot) tall skyscraper located in Wuhan. It became the tallest building in Wuhan after its completion in 1998. However, it was surpassed by the Minsheng Bank Building in 2007.

The Wuhan Greenland Center is a planned , 126-floor mixed-use skyscraper currently under construction and scheduled for completion in 2019. If completed as planned, it will be among the world's tallest structures, and one of the world's tallest buildings by occupiable floor height. The Phoenix Towers are proposed supertall skyscrapers planned for construction in Wuhan.

Notable Wuhanese

Politics 
 Li Yuanhong – former President of the Republic of China (1916–17, 1922–23).

 Wu Yi – former Vice-Premier and Minister of Health of the People's Republic of China

Business 
 Wei Brian – Chinese entrepreneur

Science 
 Chang-Lin Tien – seventh Chancellor of the University of California, Berkeley (1990–1997) and a major founder of the U.S. National Academy of Engineering (NAE). Professor Tien is the first Asian to head a top university in the United States.
 E Dongchen – "father of polar surveying and mapping" in China
 Long Lehao – Aerospace engineer and the chief designer of Long March expendable launch system rockets
 Weiping Zou – Charles B. de Nancrede Professor of Pathology, Immunology, Biology, and Surgery at the University of Michigan, American Association for Cancer Research Cancer Immunology (CIMM) Chairperson 2018–2019, Abstract Programming Chair for the American Association of Immunologists

Sports 
 Deng Zhuoxiang – professional football player, scored many impressive goals for Chinese national team in important games including 3:0 South Korea and 1:0 France in 2010.
 Fu Mingxia – female diver, four-time Olympic Gold Medalist (one in Barcelona 1992, two in Atlanta 1996, one in Sydney 2000), the only diver that has won gold medals at three Olympics as well as one of the very few divers in the world who is able to win world championships in both platform diving and springboard diving.
 Gao Ling – professional badminton player, two-time Olympic gold medalist (Sydney 2000, Athens 2004).
 Hao Junmin – professional football player, played for Schalke 04 in the German League.
 Hu Jia – Chinese diver who won the gold medal at the 2004 Summer Olympics in the men's 10 meter platform.
 Mei Fang – Chinese footballer playing for Guangzhou Evergrande in the Chinese Super League.
 Li Na – former tennis player, champion of the French Open 2011 and Australian Open 2014.
 Li Ting – tennis player, Olympic gold medalist (in women's doubles, Athens 2004).
 Liang Patti – Chinese American acrobat.
 Qiao Hong – female table tennis player, two-time Olympic gold medalist (in women's doubles, Barcelona 1992, Atlanta 1996).
 Rong Hao – professional football player, with six Chinese Super League titles and two AFC Champions League champion titles.
 Tang Jieli – AIBA Women's Boxing World Champion.
 Xiao Hailiang – Chinese diver, Olympic gold medalist (in  springboard synchronized diving, Sydney 2000).
 Zeng Cheng – professional football player, with six Chinese Super League titles and two AFC Champions League champion titles.
 Zhou Jihong – female diver, Olympic gold medalist (Los Angeles 1984), the first Chinese athlete to win an Olympic gold medal in diving.
 Tian Tao – Olympic weightlifter
 Lü Xiaojun – Olympic weightlifter

Arts 
 Chi Li – writer
 Ying Chang Compestine, a Chinese American author, speaker, television host and chef
 Laura Gao, graphic novelist, author of Messy Roots
 Liu Yifei – actress and singer. Childhood friend with Yao Beina
 Peng Xiuwen – composer and conductor
 Tian Yuan – singer and actress
 Paula Tsui – singer who spent most of her singing career in Hong Kong
 Wang Kai – actor
 Zhou Mi – musician, member of the band Super Junior M
 Zhu Yilong – actor
 Yao Beina – singer, (during 2005–2015) known as the "Voice of China", spiritual leader of organ donation and charity (1981–2015).
 Xie Fang – actress and author
 Xu Fan – actress
 Yan Wenjing – writer whose work is included as one of the literary selections on the Putonghua Proficiency Test.
 Wang Xiaosong – artist who studied in Germany and is now professor at Zhejiang University in Hangzhou
 Han Dong – Musician, member of the Kpop group Dreamcatcher

Other fields 
 Saint Francis Regis Clet was martyred here
 Hua Mulan – Ancient Chinese heroine whose story has been passed through ages in China and has been presented in a great number of books and motion pictures, including the Disney animated feature Mulan (1998).
 Samuel David Hawkins - American soldier in the Korean War who was captured by the North, subsequently defected to China at the time of the Korean Armistice Agreement. He worked as a mechanic in Wuhan until 1957.
 Wu Shuqing – female revolutionary and militia leader during the Xinhai Revolution
  – the soldier who started and led the Wuhan Uprising in the Chinese Revolution of 1911 which gave birth to the Republic of China, Asia's first republic country.
 Zhong Ziqi – The best friend of Yu Boya, an ancient Chinese musician whose musical composition "Flowing Water" was included on the Voyager Golden Record
 Ai Jingjing – Chinese novelist.

Sister cities

Wuhan is twinned with:

And Wuhan has friendly exchange relationships with:

Former Twinnings 

The city of Arnhem has unilaterally ended its twinning with Wuhan on July 21, 2021, citing concerns about the Uyghur genocide.

Nature and wildlife
In Chinese mythology, the Baiji ("Yangtze River dolphin") has many origin stories. In one legend, the Baiji was the daughter of a general who was deported from the city of Wuhan during a war. During his duty, the daughter ran away. Later, the general met a woman who told him how her father was a general, and when he realized that she was his daughter, he threw himself into the river out of shame. The daughter ran after him and also fell into the river. Before they were drowned, the daughter was transformed into a dolphin, and the general a porpoise.

See also

 Historical capitals of China
 List of cities in the People's Republic of China by population
 List of current and former capitals of subnational entities of China

References

Sources
 . Internet Edition 2004.

Further reading

  .
 
 
 
 
 
 
 
 
 Walravens, Hartmut. "German Influence on the Press in China."  In: Newspapers in International Librarianship: Papers Presented by the Newspaper Section at IFLA General Conferences. Walter de Gruyter,  2003.  Also available at (Archive) the website of the Queens Library This version does not include the footnotes visible in the Walter de Gruyter version. Also available in Walravens, Hartmut and Edmund King. Newspapers in international librarianship: papers presented by the newspapers section at IFLA General Conferences. K.G. Saur, 2003. .

External links

 Wuhan Government website
 Wuhan Time
 Google Maps Wuhan
 Wuhan 2019 Population 

 
2nd-millennium BC establishments in China
Former national capitals
Jianghan Plain
National Forest Cities in China
Populated places on the Yangtze River
Port cities and towns in China
Provincial capitals in China
Sub-provincial cities in the People's Republic of China
Wuhan urban agglomeration
Populated places established in the 2nd millennium BC
Prefecture-level divisions of Hubei
Cities in Hubei